Robert George Courtney (27 April 1959 – 28 January 2016) was a champion New Zealand Paralympian.

Early life
Born on 27 April 1959,  Courtney spent his childhood in Auckland and was educated at St Peter's College.

Athletics career
Courtney represented New Zealand in the 1982 Paraplegic Olympics in Hong Kong in the 100 metres and 200 metres Wheelchair Sprints for which he won gold medals and set world records. He also represented New Zealand in the 1984 Summer Paralympics at Stoke Mandeville, England, where he won, and set a world record in, the men's 100 m 4. In the same games he also won a bronze medal in the Men's King of the Straight - 100 m 1A-6.

Death
Courtney died in Auckland on 28 January 2016. He had suffered from kidney problems for over 20 years.

References

External links 
 
 

1959 births
2016 deaths
New Zealand male athletes
Paralympic athletes of New Zealand
Paralympic gold medalists for New Zealand
Paralympic bronze medalists for New Zealand
Paralympic medalists in athletics (track and field)
Athletes (track and field) at the 1984 Summer Paralympics
Medalists at the 1984 Summer Paralympics
Athletes from Auckland
People educated at St Peter's College, Auckland